Peter Bitley House is a historic home located at Jerusalem in Yates County, New York. It is a Greek Revival style structure built about 1837.

It was listed on the National Register of Historic Places in 1994.

References

Houses on the National Register of Historic Places in New York (state)
Greek Revival houses in New York (state)
Houses completed in 1837
Houses in Yates County, New York
National Register of Historic Places in Yates County, New York